The Arslan Tash amulets are talismans found at Arslan Tash (literally "Lion Stone") in northwest Syria, the site of ancient Hadatu. They are to be distinguished from larger finds such as the Arslan Tash reliefs. The inscriptions on the tablets are known as KAI 27.

Discovery
In 1933, Robert du Mesnil du Buisson purchased from a peasant two inscribed limestone plaques "Arslan Tash 1" ("AT1") and the smaller "Arslan Tash 2" ("AT2") which are now in the Museum of Aleppo. His drawings and photographs of AT1 were published in 1939. Count du Mesnil du Buisson made gypsum casts of the tablets, though these are now lost.

Description
Since the small rectangular plaque had a hole in one end it was identified as an amulet. On the obverse is a lamassu (a winged lion with a human head, a talismanic figure) standing over a she-wolf with a scorpion's tail (a demonic figure) devouring a male or female figure. On the reverse is a marching god with late-Assyrian headgear carrying an axe instead of the expected lightning bolt.

The limestone plaque "AT1" includes incantations meant to deter demons from entering the household, and the appeals to such deities as Assur, Baal, Horon, and to Heaven and Earth.

Nevertheless, rather than 'Assur', some scholars interpret the inscription as referring to the female deity Asherah.

 "Although other scholars like T. Caster (1942) proposed reading the first god-name as Asur rather than Asherah, Cross and Saley (1970:46) support the "Asherah" reading..."

Mesnil du Buisson and Caquot published AT2 in 1971. It shows a male demon, "m-z-h". It measures 53 by 33 mm. and contains short inscriptions on both sides that are written in the same language and script as the first amulet.

Translations
Working from du Mesnil du Buisson's photographs, and in some cases casts, the text on the plaque "AT1" was translated from the Phoenician by Dupont-Sommer (1939), Albright (1939), Gaster (1942) (1947) Torczyner (1947) Cross and Saley (1970) Texidor (1971) Caquot (1973), and Röllig (1974). Albright introduced some readings which have now been shown to be incorrect; modern scholarship now follows Caquot.

The text includes a broken word lly- which with the addition of -t could possibly be analogous to the Hebrew Lilith, or ll wyn "night and day".

Authenticity
The authenticity of the amulets AT1 and AT2 has been questioned, particularly by J. Teixidor and P. Amiet (1983), who examined the originals in the National Museum of Aleppo. However Jacobus van Dijk (1992) defends the tablets as genuine. Dennis Pardee (1998) leaves the matter open to question.

Most scholars accept the authenticity of Arslan Tash amulet AT1 at this time.

See also
Canaanite and Aramaic inscriptions

References

Literature
Willett, E.A.R. 1999. Women and household shrines in ancient Israel. PhD dissertation, University of Arizona.
Brown, W. (2019, February 26). Arslan Tash Amulet. World History Encyclopedia. Retrieved from https://www.worldhistory.org/Arslan_Tash_Amulet

1933 archaeological discoveries
Archaeology of the Near East
Archaeological discoveries in Syria
Syrian art
Talismans
Lilith
Forgery controversies
KAI inscriptions
Asherah
Baal